Wiesław Wawrzyniec Tokarz (born 10 August 1951) is a Polish former ice hockey player. He played for Podhale Nowy Targ, GKS Katowice, and Zagłębie Sosnowiec during his career. Tokarz won the Polish league championship six times, twice with Podhale in 1971 and 1972, and with Zagłębie from 1980 until 1983. He also played for the Polish national team at the 1972 Winter Olympics and multiple World Championships. His brother, Leszek, also played hockey, and was a teammate at the 1972 Winter Olympics. In 2005 he was awarded the Gold Cross of Merit for his services to sport.

References

External links
 

1951 births
Living people
GKS Katowice (ice hockey) players
Ice hockey players at the 1972 Winter Olympics
KH Zagłębie Sosnowiec players
Olympic ice hockey players of Poland
People from Nowy Targ
Sportspeople from Lesser Poland Voivodeship
Podhale Nowy Targ players
Polish ice hockey forwards
Recipients of the Gold Cross of Merit (Poland)